Czech Television (abbreviation: ČT) is a public television broadcaster in the Czech Republic, broadcasting seven channels. Established after the Velvet Revolution in 1992, it is the successor to Czechoslovak Television founded in 1953.

History

1953–1992: Czechoslovak Television 
Founded on 1 May 1953, Czechoslovak Television (ČST) was the state television broadcaster of Czechoslovakia used as a state propaganda medium of the then socialist state.

ČST originally consisted of a single channel and limited experimental broadcasting in 1953. Regular broadcasts began on 25 February 1954 and on 10 May 1970, a second channel was launched. The broadcast language of ČST was predominantly Czech in the first channel, Slovak for selected programming, and both for news. The second channel was split into two, broadcasting various "national" language programming in the two parts of the country.

The main headquarters of ČST was located in Prague, but it also had main studios in Bratislava, Košice, Ostrava and Brno.

The first public broadcasting was a short performance by František Filipovský (1907–1993) on 1 May 1953. On 11 February 1955, the first live broadcast was made, an ice hockey match from Prague. Like all other media in communist Czechoslovakia, the station was subject to heavy censorship. However, as part of the process of social liberation in 1968, ČST aired broadcasts about the Prague Spring for a few days. However, in 1969, it became part of the normalisation efforts of the national media.

On 10 May 1970, Czechoslovak Television began broadcasting a second channel, ČST TV2. Further technical improvements were made on 9 May 1973, when the first regular broadcasts in colour started on TV2, followed two years later by colour transmission on the first channel as well.

At the end of the decade, in 1979, a building and a studio based in Prague's Kavčí hory was opened, which became the home of ČST's news department.

After November 1989, lineup changes were made, with the first channel being renamed F1 for the federal district, and the second channel being split into the Czech ČTV and the Slovak S1, the first such division of channels by ČST. A third channel for Czech audiences, previously used by Soviet broadcasting, was launched on 14 May 1990, called OK3. A replacement channel for Slovak audiences called TA3 was created on 6 June 1991 (broadcasting from August 1991 until July 1992).

During the Velvet Revolution, ČST staff very quickly joined the side of the protesters and allowed them to spread important messages and broadcasts of the demonstrations.

ČST ended its broadcast with the Dissolution of Czechoslovakia at the end of 1992, with two public television stations established in its place: Česká televize and Slovenská televízia, both successors of ČST. ČST disappeared along with Czechoslovakia on 31 December 1992.

Czech Television
Czech Television was established by the Czech Television Act of the Czech National Council (Act No. 483/1991 Coll.) on 1 January 1992, as a public television service for the citizens of the Czech Republic, with property transferred from Czechoslovak Television. Czech Television was established 1 January 1992 as a successor to Czechoslovak Television. It is based on Czech Television Act (Act No. 483/1991 Coll.) as a television service for the citizens of the Czech Republic.

On 3 February 1994, Czech Television freed one of the nationwide broadcast channels in accordance with the law; starting 4 February 1994 Czech Television was left with two channels, ČT1 and ČT2.

In 2005, news channel ČT24 and the following year ČT Sport were launched and on 1 October 2005 logos were rebranded. In 2013, the broadcaster added two new channels, ČT :D (children's) and ČT art (arts/culture). In April 2020, ČT3 was relaunched this time targeting the older generation / elderly.

2000–2001: Czech TV crisis 

The "Czech TV crisis" occurred at the end of 2000 and lasted until early 2001 as a battle for control of the airwaves, which included jamming and accusations of censorship. During the Czech TV crisis, Czech TV reporters organized an industrial dispute by staging a sit-in and occupying the news studio and rejected attempts by Jana Bobošíková to fire them. They were supported in their protest by politicians such as the then President Václav Havel (1936–2011) and by Czech celebrities, but every time they tried to air their news broadcasts, Bobošíková and Jiří Hodač would jam the transmission either with a "technical fault" screen reading: "An unauthorized signal has entered this transmitter. Broadcasting will resume in a few minutes", or with their own news broadcasts featuring Jana Bobošíková and a team she had hired to "replace" the staff members she had sought to terminate.

The Czech TV crisis eventually ended in early 2001, following the departure from Czech TV of Hodač and Bobošíková, under pressure by the street demonstration participants and at the request of the Czech Parliament, which had held an emergency session due to the crisis.

Channels

Current

Former

Station

Television studios
Within the framework of television operates two television studios. Television studio Brno is based in the second-largest city in Czech Republic and was founded in 1961. The second studio is based in Ostrava and was founded in 1955. In the year 2001, the Czech government stated that TV studios have to contribute to television production in the range of at least 20% share in national television broadcasting and at least 25 minutes of regional news coverage in their area of competence.

Charity
Czech Television is well known for its wide contributions to many charities. They are mainly raising money by broadcasting many beneficial programmes. As an example, every year Czech television is broadcasting a beneficial evening of well known Czech charity organization "Centrum Paraple" where various artists perform their mostly musical performances. Centrum Paraple is an organization which focuses on helping people with physical handicaps.

Education
Czech Television is creating and broadcasting various educational and awareness-raising programs intended for various age and interest groups. Czech television also cooperates with various domestic high schools and universities. For example, this includes, the provision of methodological worksheets, which are complementary to audiovisual demonstrations of television programs. Regarding universities, Czech television organizes program "ČT start" which offers various workshops or even job opportunities for students who are in their final year.

European Broadcasting Union
Since 1993 Czech television is a member of European Broadcasting Union (EBU), which is the largest professional association of national broadcasters in the world and brings together over 70 active members from more than fifty countries in Europe, North Africa, and the Middle East and other associate members from around the world.

Funding and criticism
Czech Television is funded through television concession fees which are paid by all households and legal entities that own a television or any form television signal receiver. Concession fees are currently set to 135 Kč per month (around €5) since 2008 and due to persistent positive inflation their real value is declining each year. On top of that, the total number of receivers has declined by 88 thousand from 2010 to 2020 and thus reduced annual income by 143 mil. Kč. Television fees are the main source of funding for Czech Television and are used primarily for production and broadcasting programs. They amount more than 90% of television income according to the budget estimate on Y2020. Additional income is earned through advertising where it is less successful than commercial television stations, because it is restricted by law and revenue from other business activities (product placement. selling rights to content, sponsoring etc.). During 2004 and 2005 the organisation lobbied the Czech government to increase the licence fee so that advertising could be eliminated, but even after multiple increasements advertising still remain on some channels with certain limitations.

Fee collection system 
Because of the decreasing amount of payers and real fee value Czech Television responds to this by making the most of the opportunities offered by legislation to identify both individuals and legal entities who are not paying the television fee. Czech legislation is allowing Czech Television to use databases of energy suppliers to identify all households which are consuming electricity and thus potentially could own a television. Persons or households detected by this system are taken as feepayer unless they make a claim that they are not by sending affidavit. In the event of revelation, the black listener is obliged to pay, in addition to the fees due, a surcharge of 10,000 for an unreported television. Addressing unregistered feepayers is associated with the cost of sending letters and higher the need for call center operators, but the television is able to collect through this method additional tens of millions.

Criticism 
Media occasionally raise questions about how much Czech Television is able to withstand pressure both from the governing parties and the opposition and maintain unbiased and critical coverage of politics. Most criticisms are from left-wing and nationalist parties and groups. In a long struggle with ČT is also president of Czech Republic, Miloš Zeman, who on the last occasion unofficially suggest to create possibility for citizens who disagree with ČT, can pay compulsory television licence fee for charitable and social programs. Because of perceived bias against Zeman and anti-leftist stances, some left-wing legislators (Jaroslav Foldyna and others) said they will vote against the annual report of ČT until all financial connections of ČT will be revealed. In 2013 was publicly revealed information about incomes and salaries of ČT official Karel Burian, director of Brno ČT who earned in the first half of 2011 nearly 2 million CZK (about 80,000 USD), which is much more than Czech Republic top politicians, including more than Prime Minister or President of Czech Republic.

Advertising restrictions 
The Act on Czech Television precisely sets the limits that Czech Television has in obtaining revenues from the sale of advertising. The law stipulates that: On ČT2 and ČT sport, advertising time may not exceed 0.5% of the daily broadcast time on each from these programs (i.e. max. 7 min and 12 sec per day), while the broadcast of advertisements may not in time from 7 pm to 10 pm exceed 6 minutes during one broadcast hour on each of these programs.

On the ČT1 and ČT24 programs, advertising may not be included in the broadcast at all, with the exception of advertising included in the broadcast of a program that is in direct connection with a cultural or sports broadcast events, if the broadcasting of such advertising is a necessary condition for the acquisition of television broadcasting rights cultural or sporting events. If an ad is included, the ad time is limited as well as on the ČT2 and ČT sport programs (ie for 7 min and 12 sec per day).

As with their acquisition, as well as the use of funds obtained from advertising, Czech Television is restricted by Act No. 302/2011 Coll.: On a quarterly basis, Czech Television transfers the revenue from advertising broadcast on the ČT2 program to the State Fund culture of the Czech Republic. Czech Television deducts the proven costs associated with the sale of advertising from the revenue.

Revenues from advertising broadcasting on the ČT sport program are used by Czech Television for production and broadcasting sports programs. Teleshopping is completely banned on Czech Television. These restrictions do not apply to product placement, which is used in own creation.

Management 
The current General Manager of Czech Television is Petr Dvořák, who was elected for a six-year term by the Czech Television Council (Rada České televize) in September 2011 and re-elected in 2017. Dvorak has courted some controversy in his tenure given his previous membership in the communist party, similar to his predecessor Jiří Janeček However, in contrast to his predecessor, Dvořák had relatively little experience in public service broadcasting, with less than a decade of prior experience as the CEO of commercial TV station Nova, under the direction of major shareholder PPF Group, serving as his only media experience. Since departing from Nova and CME, PPF has acquired a controlling interest in the station from American conglomerate AT&T.

Czech television is one of the major employers in the area of film and art in the Czech Republic with 3005 employees to date 31.12.2019.

Czech Television Council 
Czech Television Council is a supervisory authority of Czech Television. The ČT Council has fifteen members elected and removed by the Chamber of Deputies so that important regional, political, social and cultural currents of opinion are represented in it. The members of the Board are elected for a term of office of 6 years, with one-third of the members being elected every 2 years; they may be re-elected. Powers of the Czech Television Council are defined by law of Czech Television and the important powers are:

 Appoint and dismiss the Director General and at his proposal, the Director of Television Studios of Czech Television
 Approve the budget and final account of Czech Television
 Oversees the fulfillment of the budget of Czech Television
 Approve long-term plans for program, technical and economic development
 Determine the salary of the general director

The Czech Television Council manages according to its own budget, the costs of the Council's activities and the remuneration of its members, as well as the costs of the Supervisory Board's activities and the remuneration of its members are paid from a special expenditure item in the Czech Television budget.

Gallery

Czech Television continued to use the corporate logo of Czechoslovak Television after 1992, so the logo was in use for 59 years from 1 May 1953 to 30 September 2012.

See also 
 Mass media in Communist Czechoslovakia

References

Bibliography

External links 

 Official site in English
 Official site in Czech
 Watch selected Czech Television programs in streaming video
 ČT24
 Czech Television content on EUscreen.eu

 
Television in the Czech Republic
Television stations in the Czech Republic
European Broadcasting Union members
Publicly funded broadcasters
Television channels and stations established in 1992
1992 establishments in Czechoslovakia

Mass media in Czechoslovakia
Eastern Bloc mass media
Television channels and stations established in 1953
Television channels and stations disestablished in 1992
1953 establishments in Czechoslovakia
1992 disestablishments in Czechoslovakia
State media
Defunct mass media in Czechoslovakia
Television broadcasting companies of the Czech Republic
Czech news websites